Swedes Flat is a former settlement in Butte County, California. It lay at an elevation of 1375 feet (419 m). It still appeared on maps as of 1895.

References

External links

Former settlements in Butte County, California
Former populated places in California